Giuseppe Fiorello, also known as Beppe Fiorello or Fiorellino (born 12 March 1969), is an Italian actor.

Career 

Fiorello was born in Catania, Sicily, the youngest of four children. His elder brother is the noted television and radio personality Rosario Fiorello, better known to Italian audiences as Fiorello.

Giuseppe's first job was as an electrician in a tourist village. In 1994, Giuseppe began his career in the entertainment business as a disk jockey on the nationally-aired Dee Jay Radio, using the name Fiorellino. That same year, he made his debut on television as a presenter for the Mediaset programme Karaoke, which his brother had also hosted. Four years later in 1998, he made his screen debut in the film L'ultimo capodanno, directed by Marco Risi. He played the part of Gaetano Malacozza. Since then he has performed regularly in films and television fiction, with many starring roles such as in L'uomo sbagliato, Joe Petrosino, La vita rubata, Giuseppe Moscati, Lo scandalo della Banca Romana and Volare in which he portrayed singer Domenico Modugno.

Filmography

Films

Television

References

External links

 

Living people
1969 births
Italian male actors
Actors from Catania
People from Taormina